The Curse of the Wraydons is a 1946 British thriller film directed by Victor M. Gover and starring Tod Slaughter, Bruce Seton and Henry Caine.
It was based on the 1928 play Spring-Heeled Jack by Maurice Sandoz, which was in turn based upon the 1849 play by W. G. Willis. It was made at Bushey Studios.

Plot
During the Napoleonic Wars an Englishman, who is sent into exile, agrees to become a spy for France. It features Victorian legendary character Spring-heeled Jack.

Cast
 Tod Slaughter – Philip Wraydon
 Bruce Seton – Jack Wraydon, 'Spring Heeled Jack' 
 Henry Caine – George Wraydon 
 Pearl Cameron – Rose Wraydon 
 Andrew Laurence – George Heeningham 
 Alan Lawrance – Squire Sedgefield 
 Lorraine Clewes – Helen Sedgefield 
 Gabriel Toyne – Payne 
 Ben Williams – John Rickers 
 John Coyle – Dennis  
 Daphne Arthur – Alice Maitland 
 Barry O'Neill – George Wraydon

Distribution

The film was released in the USA by Hoffberg Productions Inc. in 1953, edited to 75 minutes and retitled Strangler's Morgue, on a double bill with Slaughter's "The Greed of William Hart", which was also retitled as Horror Maniacs. Another version starring Tod Slaughter was produced in 1950 by BBC titled Spring-Heeled Jack.

References

External links

1946 films
British historical horror films
1940s historical horror films
1940s horror thriller films
1946 horror films
1940s English-language films
Films directed by Victor M. Gover
British films based on plays
Films set in the 1800s
Napoleonic Wars films
British black-and-white films
British horror thriller films
British historical thriller films
1940s British films